Adam Lasus (born September 2, 1968 in Mount Kisco, New York, United States) is an American record producer, recording engineer and musician.

Career
Lasus credits include albums by Yo La Tengo, Clap Your Hands Say Yeah, Lilys, Helium, Juliana Hatfield, Mark Mulcahy, Dean Ween, Matt Keating, Clem Snide, Amy Ray, Madder Rose, Army Navy, Michael Cerveris, Anders Parker, Chris Harford, Versus, Dumptruck and Gigolo Aunts.

Lasus started Studio Red in Philadelphia, Pennsylvania, in 1990, and recorded many indie rock artists there: Helium, Versus, The Lilys, Madder Rose, Space Needle, Varnaline, Joey Sweeney, Matt Keating and many more.

In 1997, he moved to Brooklyn and started Fireproof Recording, a recording studio, which became an important part of the indie music scene in Brooklyn and New York City. While there Lasus worked with PJ Harvey, J Mascis, Joan Jett, Clap Your Hands Say Yeah, Mark Mulcahy, Spike Priggen, Violet, Daniel Johnston, As well as Members of Sleater Kinney, Cheap Trick, R.E.M., Guided By Voices, The Breeders, The Posies, Sonic Youth, The Beastie Boys, The Go-Betweens and Ween.

Lasus has always recorded to analog tape and believes that recording and mixing to tape produces the best possible sonic result. Typically his records are started by recording the band live to a 24-track 2-inch tape machine and he uses a large selection of unique vintage compressors, microphones, mic preamps, eq's, reverbs, tape delays and effects.

Fireproof Recording moved to Los Angeles in 2005 where Lasus worked with indie artists Anders Parker, Army Navy, The Submarines, Seneca Hawk, Marching Band,  Happyness, The Shivers, Kelli Scarr, Emperor X and Matt Keating.

In 2008, Lasus worked as the music director and music producer for the film Bandslam directed by Todd Graff and starring Vanessa Hudgens,  Alyson Michalka, Lisa Kudrow and David Bowie, in theaters August 2009.

Lasus produced and engineered the second Army Navy album The Last Place released June 14, 2011. The Last Place went to # 28 on the CMJ top 200 chart and Rolling Stone has called them an "artist to watch."

In April 2013, Lasus and his partners Joe Rogers and Scott Porter, opened Room 17, a 3200 square foot studio in Bushwick, Brooklyn, featuring a vintage 40 channel Trident 80 console, Extensive outboard gear and 24 track analog recording.

In August 2014, Lasus was the music producer for the film If I Stay, starring Chloë Grace Moretz and Jamie Blackley. Lasus produced six original songs and a cover of the song "Today" by Smashing Pumpkins, that were performed by the fictional band, Willamette Stone, in the film led by Jamie Blackley's character, Adam Wilde. The songs were all released on the If I Stay Original Motion Picture Soundtrack on Warner Brothers/ Water Tower Records.

In 2019, Lasus re-opened Studio Red in North Hollywood, 23 years after closing the original Studio Red in Philadelphia in 1996. Lasus wanted to get back to the fun and vibey recording environment that helped establish him in the 1990s. Since opening the new Studio Red Lasus worked with long time collaborator Chris Harford, as well as singer-songwriters Lauren Hoffman, Joe Lima and Jason Lerman. The Los Angeles-based bands, Swerve, Easy Dreams, The Lightjackets, The Pretty Flowers, Much Better, Snowball ii, Mihi Nihil, IEVA and Army Navy, have all recorded at the new Studio Red.

Selected discography

Lasus is credited with the following works:

References
www.mixonline.com/recording/fireproof-recording

Further reading

External links
 
 discogs.com/artist/304940-Adam-Lasus

1968 births
Living people
Record producers from New York (state)
People from Mount Kisco, New York